Andre T. Johnson (born August 25, 1973) is a former American football offensive tackle in the National Football League for the Washington Redskins (1996), the Miami Dolphins (1997), and the Detroit Lions (1997–1998).  He played college football at Penn State University and was selected in the first round of the 1996 NFL Draft by the Washington Redskins, who were looking for a replacement of their aging tackle Jim Lachey.  In his NFL career Johnson only played three games, each for the Lions and is usually considered to be one of the worst first round picks of all time.

References

External links
NFL.com player page

1973 births
Living people
American football offensive tackles
Detroit Lions players
Miami Dolphins players
Penn State Nittany Lions football players
People from Southampton (town), New York
Washington Redskins players
Players of American football from New York (state)